Greentown China Holdings Limited, headquartered in Hangzhou, Zhejiang, is one of the leading privately held residential property developers in China and the largest property developer in Zhejiang Province. It does not only focus on its home market of Hangzhou, but also has operations in Shanghai, Beijing, Changsha and other select cities.

History
Greentown China was founded in 1995 in Hangzhou. It was listed on the Hong Kong Stock Exchange in July 2006 with the IPO price of HK$8.22 per share.

References

Companies listed on the Hong Kong Stock Exchange
Companies based in Hangzhou
Real estate companies of China
Privately held companies of China
Companies established in 1995